This is a list of Major League Gaming national championships, including results from 2004 to the present.

2004 - New York City

2005 - New York City

2006 - Las Vegas

2007 - Las Vegas

2008 - Las Vegas

2009 - Anaheim

2009 - Orlando

2010 - Dallas

2011 - Providence

2012 - Winter Championship - Columbus

2012 - Spring Championship - Anaheim

2012 - Summer Championship - Raleigh

Note: Curse and Dignitas were both disqualified for involvement with a fixing scandal, which resulted in splitting the first and second place prize pools between third through sixth place.

2012 - Fall Championship - Dallas

2013 - Winter Championship - Dallas

2013 - Spring Championship - Anaheim

2013 - Fall Championship - Columbus

2014 - Anaheim

2015 World Finals
The MLG 2015 World Finals took place in New Orleans, Louisiana, United States on October 16–18, 2015. The event featured five games, Call of Duty: Advanced Warfare, Dota 2, Smite, Super Smash Bros. Melee, and Super Smash Bros. for Wii U.

Notably, ZeRo's record-setting, 56-tournament winning streak was broken after he lost to Nairo.

References

Major League